The Oxford and Cambridge University Boat Race is an 1895 British short black-and-white silent documentary film directed and produced by Birt Acres. It was filmed on 30 March 1895.

This film became the first in the UK to be commercially screened outside London and was displayed at Cardiff Town Hall on 5 May 1896.

Content

The film consists of a simple shot (approximately one minute or less) of the 1895 edition of the Oxford versus Cambridge University Boat Race.

References

External links 
 

1895 films
1890s British films
British short documentary films
British silent short films
Seafaring films
Documentary films about water transport
Rowing films
1890s short documentary films
Black-and-white documentary films
The Boat Race
Films directed by Birt Acres
Documentary films about England
1895 in London
Films shot in London
British black-and-white films
British sports documentary films
Silent adventure films